Gemütlichkeit is a German-language word used to convey the idea of a state or feeling of warmth, friendliness, and good cheer. Other qualities encompassed by the term include cosiness, peace of mind, and a sense of belonging and well-being springing from social acceptance.  The adjective "gemütlich" is translated as "cosy" so "Gemütlichkeit" could be simply translated as "cosiness."

History and etymology
"Gemütlichkeit" derives from gemütlich, the adjective of Gemüt, which means "heart, mind, temper, feeling" expressed by (and cognate with) English mood. The German abstract noun Gemütlichkeit has been adopted into English. The current meaning of the word derives from its use in the Biedermeier period. By the second half of the 19th century, it also became associated with a set of traits supposedly unique to the Austrian culture. 

The word can be used in descriptions of holidays. In the 1973 English contract law case Jarvis v Swans Tours Ltd, a holidaymaker sued after not receiving the Gemütlichkeit promised by the promotional literature for a package holiday to the Swiss Alps.

The communal connotations of Gemütlichkeit are also emphasized in some uses of the term.  For example, one academic described it as a tradition of "public festivity" (in the form of a "mixture of music, food, and drink"), which "promote[d] community solidarity."  The Harlem Renaissance was then cited as of how a sense of Gemütlichkeit arises from a "mix of music, art and politics in service of community consciousness".

Gemütlichkeit has been appropriated at least once to describe the tenor of an economic era rather than spirit of a social gathering.  In analyzing the "inflation dampening effects of globalization" a Georgia Southern University professor wrote that certain U.S. economic trends could "spell an end of the Gemütlichkeit — a situation in which cheap labor and money abroad as well as ever-increasing productivity at home had permitted an uninterrupted spell of controlled growth in overall prices".

Similar words in other languages
English has no direct translation for gemütlich or Gemütlichkeit. Cosy captures an element of it but crucially lacks those of friendliness and belonging.  

The English author G. K. Chesterton mentioned Gemütlichkeit in his 1906 book on Charles Dickens.  In the first half of the seventh chapter on "English comfort" he wrote that "... the thing you cannot see out of Germany is a German beer-garden", a venue which is the very epitome of Gemütlichkeit in that nation.  Later, seeking to define what he regarded as a peculiarly English quality captured in the chapter title English comfort, he continued, "The word comfort is not indeed the right word, it conveys too much of the slander of mere sense; the true word is cosiness, a word not translatable."  Indeed, it is no direct synonym for Gemütlichkeit.

The Swedish language equivalent is gemytlig, deriving directly from the German word and sharing its meaning.

The Danish also has gemytlig  but uses hygge  (hyggelig as an adjective) instead.  In Norwegian the word is rendered "gemyttlig", but words such as "hyggelig" and "koselig" which means cosy, comfortable, nice, or pleasant, are analogues.

The Dutch equivalent gezelligheid, derived from the adjective gezellig, has broader social connotations than the German Gemütlichkeit and can be more accurately compared to the Danish term hygge.

The Romance languages with Latin roots do not have a single term expressing the many connotations of Gemütlichkeit.

See also
Quality time

References

External links

 

German words and phrases
Words and phrases with no direct English translation
Pleasure
Mental states